Baldwin Gardens is an east–west road running between Gray's Inn Road and Leather Lane, in Camden, London, England.

The surrounding streets were laid out in the 17th century on an intersecting grid pattern from north to south, east to west. Baldwin Gardens was named after Baldwin, gardener to Queen Elizabeth I.

The Bourne Estate is a group of well-regarded Edwardian tenement blocks on the north side of the road.

References

Streets in the London Borough of Camden